State Road 157 (NM 157) is a , paved, two-lane state highway in Doña Ana County in the U.S. state of New Mexico. The highway lies entirely within the community of Radium Springs. NM 157's western terminus is at the road's junction with NM 185. The road's eastern terminus is at the road's junction with Interstate 25 (I-25) and U.S. Route 85 (US 85). NM 157 is also known as Fort Selden Road.

Route description
The highway begins at the junction with NM 185 in the southwest corner of village of Radium Springs. Right after the junction, NM 157 crosses the Leasburg Canal over  bridge built in 1962. The road heads northeast through the residential areas of Radium Springs, passes by Fort Selden State Monument, and after  crosses railroad tracks of El Paso Subdivision of BNSF Railway. Continuing northeast NM 157 arrives at I-25, crosses it over a  bridge built in 1966, before reaching its northeastern terminus at intersection with the northbound ramps on the east side of I-25. The road continues as Doña Ana County Route E 70 past the junction.

History
The road was constructed in 1960s as a connector between old US 85 and a newly constructed I-25 and was designated as part of the New Mexico State Road 28. In 1988 the New Mexico Department of Transportation (NMDOT) went through a radical road renumbering program, which also included elimination of US 85 in New Mexico. As part of this reorganization, the road through Rincon was designated as NM 157.

Major intersections

See also

References

External links

157
Transportation in Doña Ana County, New Mexico